Klaus Kübler (born 17 April 1959) is a retired West German triple jumper.

He became West German champion in 1977 and 1980.

Achievements

References

1959 births
Living people
West German male triple jumpers